Christel Lau (born 3 May 1944) is a retired German field hockey player.

Lau grew up in Hildesheim, Lower Saxony. Initially a track and field athlete, she did not start playing hockey until the age of 25. Lau played for Eintracht Braunschweig. With her club, she won eight German championship titles. She also played 24 games in total for the German national team.

With West Germany, Lau won the 1976 Women's Hockey World Cup.

In 1974, Lau was awarded the Silbernes Lorbeerblatt. In 1988, she was inducted into the hall of fame of the Lower Saxon Institute of Sports History.

References

External links 
 

1944 births
Living people
German female field hockey players
People from Malbork
Sportspeople from Hildesheim
Recipients of the Silver Laurel Leaf
People from West Prussia
20th-century German women